The Irish Long Distance Swimming Association (ILDSA) has provided authentication observers for swimmers attempting to cross the approximately  North Channel between Northern Ireland and the Mull of Galloway.  According to the ILDSA, this was first accomplished in 1947 by Tom Blower. The first two-way crossing was completed by a six-person relay team on 28 July 2015.

The North Channel is part of the Ocean's seven, a set of seven long-distance open-water swims considered the marathon swimming equivalent of the Seven Summits mountaineering challenge.

Solo (including two-way)

Relay teams

References

Open water swimming
Eng